Laves may refer to:

 Fritz Laves (1906-1978), a German mineralogist and crystallographer, best known for his description of the intermetallic Laves phases.
 Georg Ludwig Friedrich Laves (December 15, 1788 – April 30, 1864) a leading neoclassical style German architect, civil engineer and urban planner of the Kingdom of Hanover.
 Gerhardt Laves (July 15, 1906 - March 14, 1993) a graduate student at the University of Chicago and Yale University doing fieldwork on Australian Aboriginal languages.
 Laves phase, a particular class of intermetallic phases